DFE or DfE may refer to:

Organizations
 Department for the Economy, Northern Ireland
 Department for Education, UK
 DePatie–Freleng Enterprises, a defunct animation company

Science
 Dilated fundus examination of the eye
 Distribution of fitness effects
 Dietary folate equivalent, bioavailability of folate

Technology
 Decision Feedback Equalizer
 Design-focused evaluation of educational quality
 Design for the Environment of a product or service
 DFE Ascender, an ultralight aircraft

Other
 Dragon Fli Empire, a Canadian hip hop group 
 Dunfermline Town railway station, Scotland, National Rail station code